The Repealing and Amending Act, 2015 is an Act of the Parliament of India that repealed 35 obsolete Acts, and also amended the provisions of The Prohibition of Manual Scavengers Act, 2013, and the Whistle Blowers Protection Act, 2011 to correct typographical and certain patent errors. It was the first such repealing Act aimed at repealing obsolete laws tabled in Parliament by the Narendra Modi administration.

Background and legislative history
Prime Minister Narendra Modi advocated the repeal of old laws during his 2014 general election campaign. At the 2015 Economic Times Global Business Summit, Modi stated, "Our country suffers from an excess of old and unnecessary laws which obstruct people and businesses. We began the exercise of identifying unnecessary laws and repealing them. 1,877 Central laws have been identified for repeal."

The Repealing and Amending Bill, 2014 was introduced in the Lok Sabha on 11 August 2014 by the Minister of Law and Justice, Ravi Shankar Prasad. The bill sought to repeal 36 Acts and pass amendments to two Acts. The bill sought to completely repeal The Indian Fisheries Act, 1897, The Foreign Jurisdiction Act, 1947, The Sugar Undertakings (Taking Over of Management) Act, 1978 and The Employment of Manual Scavengers and Construction of Dry Latrines (Prohibition) Act, 1993. The remaining 32 were all amending acts whose changes had been incorporated into the existing Acts. The bill also sought to amend provisions of The Prohibition of Manual Scavengers Act, 2013, and The Whistle Blowers Protection Act, 2011 so as to correct typographical and certain patent errors, such as the year of enactment.

The bill was referred to the Parliamentary Standing Committee on Personnel, Public Grievances, Law and Justice on 22 September. The Committee submitted its report on the bill on 19 December 2015. The report recommended that the bill be passed, however, it opposed the repeal of the Manual Scavenging and Construction of Dry Latrines (Prohibition) Act, 1993. The Committee also suggested that the government consider adding a sunset clause to amending act to ensure that they would be repealed automatically and would not remain in the statute books after their purpose was achieved.

The bill, as recommended by the Committee, was passed by the Lok Sabha on 18 March and by the Rajya Sabha on 5 May 2015. The bill received assent from President Pranab Mukherjee on 13 May 2015, and was notified in The Gazette of India on the same day.

Repealed Acts
The following 35 acts, included in the bill's First Schedule, were completely repealed:

See also 
 List of legislations repealed under Modi government

References

Modi administration
Repealed Indian legislation
Acts of the Parliament of India 2015